The 1978 Ole Miss Rebels football team represented the University of Mississippi (Ole Miss) during the 1978 NCAA Division I-A football season as a member of the Southeastern Conference (SEC). The team was led by head coach Steve Sloan, in his first year, and they played their home games at Hemingway Stadium in Oxford, Mississippi and Mississippi Memorial Stadium in Jackson, Mississippi. Some of the outstanding players on the team of that year were Bobby Garner, Leon Perry, Reginald Woullard, Roy Coleman, Freddie Williams, etc. They finished the season with a record of five wins and six losses (5–6, 2–4 SEC).

Schedule

Roster

Game summaries

Mississippi State

References

Ole Miss
Ole Miss Rebels football seasons
Ole Miss Rebels football